Allithwaite is a small village in Cumbria, England, located roughly  west of Grange-over-Sands. Most of its residents commute to local areas of Ulverston, Barrow-in-Furness, Kendal or Lancaster to work. Historically in Lancashire, Allithwaite, and the village of Cartmel situated to the north, are part of the civil parish of Lower Allithwaite. At the 2001 census, the parish had a population of 1,758, increasing to 1,831 at the 2011 Census. There is also a civil parish previously known as Upper Allithwaite which was renamed in 2018 as Lindale and Newton-in-Cartmel, and includes Lindale, Low Newton and High Newton. The population of this parish at the 2011 Census was 843.

The Anglican parish church is  St. Mary's Church, built in 1864–65 and designed by the Lancaster architect E. G. Paley.
There is a small primary school, Allithwaite Primary C of E School located next to the church. Both church and school were built by a legacy left to the village. The village also has a pub, a post office, a children's playground and a reasonably sized playing field with a tennis court and a bowling green.

Wraysholme Tower

A mile to the south, Wraysholme Tower is a 15th-century pele tower, used as a barn and cow-house, adjoining a 19th-century farmhouse. The tower was built by the Harrington family of Aldingham. A Michael Harrington acquired a grant of free warren in Allingham in 1315. It has axes north and south and is built of local limestone rubble, with angle quoins. There is a projecting garderobe, about  square, at the south-west corner, where there is a spiral staircase. There was originally an entrance at the north-west corner. The building is roofed with slate.

Boarbank Hall

Boarbank Hall, to the west of the village, is a convent, nursing home and guest house, with a community of twelve Augustinian sisters and two Benedictine sisters. There has been a house on the site since at least 1592, but the present house, in an Italian style, was built in 1870 after a fire had destroyed the previous frontage. The Augustinian Cannonesses acquired the house in 1921. The Oratory, built in 1986, was the subject of an episode of BBC television's Building Sights, featuring architect Richard MacCormac, in 1991.

See also

Listed buildings in Lower Allithwaite

References

External links

  Cumbria County History Trust: Allithwaite, Lower (nb: provisional research only - see Talk page)
  Cumbria County History Trust: Allithwaite, Upper (nb: provisional research only - see Talk page)
Allithwaite C of E Primary School

Villages in Cumbria
South Lakeland District